Marin Ljubičić may refer to:

Marin Ljubičić (footballer, born 1988), Croatian football defensive midfielder
Marin Ljubičić (footballer, born 2002), Croatian football forward